Ali Sanders (born 15 December 1970) is a British physician and rower. She competed in the women's eight event at the 2000 Summer Olympics. She later qualified as a consultant in emergency medicine. She was also the clinical director of the Emergency Department at St. Mary’s Hospital.

References

External links
 
 

1970 births
Living people
British female rowers
Olympic rowers of Great Britain
Rowers at the 2000 Summer Olympics
People from Hertford